James Hodge (5 July 1891 – 2 September 1970) was a Scottish professional footballer who played in the Football League for Manchester United, Millwall, Norwich City and Southend United as a full back or centre half.

Personal life 
Hodge's younger brother John and a brother-in-law also became a footballers. He served as a gunner in India and Mesopotamia with the Royal Garrison Artillery during the First World War.

Career statistics

References

External links
John Hodge at MUFCInfo.com

1890s births
1970 deaths
People from Stenhousemuir
Scottish footballers
Stenhousemuir F.C. players
Manchester United F.C. players
Millwall F.C. players
Norwich City F.C. players
Southend United F.C. players
Footballers from Falkirk (council area)
British Army personnel of World War I

Buxton F.C. players
Association football fullbacks
Association football wing halves
Royal Garrison Artillery soldiers
English Football League players
Military personnel from Falkirk (council area)